Avia Solutions Group Arena, located in southern part of Verkiai elderate of Vilnius, is the second largest arena in Lithuania.  It generally hosts basketball games as well as concerts. The arena opened on 30 October 2004.

The basketball club Rytas Vilnius, which currently competes in the domestic LKL, and in FIBA Champions League, uses the facility for all of its European home fixtures. Avia Solutions Group Arena also hosts Rytas' home fixtures of the Lithuanian "national derby" against its archrival Žalgiris Kaunas in both the LKL and BBL. The rest of the games are played in the adjacent Jeep Arena.

History
Siemens Arena is one of the most important and significant Lithuanian sport, entertainment, and cultural objects, which has earned the recognition of countries all over the world: in 2004, the arena was selected as the best sport building of the year in Lithuania. In the same year, it won the right to host the 2011 Men's European Basketball Championship.

In the end of  2007 the arbitrator of international product brands Superbrands awarded Siemens Arena as one of the most prominent brands in Lithuania. The Superbrands award was given to 28 product brands, which differs by their influence to the market, values, ways to success and originality.

Siemens Arena was built in the Vilnius Entertainment Park territory and is the first object of this park, which is still under development. The other buildings for the Vilnius Entertainment Park next to the arena: an indoor water park, family entertainment center, an Event field and a natural park.

The venue is scheduled to host some matches of the 2021 FIFA Futsal World Cup.

In November 2020, Siemens Arena was renamed to Avia Solutions Group Arena.

Events
Siemens Arena is the first universal arena of international level in Lithuania. Here, the largest and most important national entertainment, sports and business events take place: concerts of world-famous and local sport stars, various international sports matches, performances, theatre performances, business seminars and assemblies.

Many world-famous music stars had performed here, including Metallica, Slipknot,  Rammstein, Anastacia, Aerosmith, Phil Collins, Def Leppard, Patricia Kaas, Lana Del Rey, James Blunt, Hurts, t.A.T.u., Deep Purple, Sting, Chris Rea, Paco de Lucía, Toto Cutugno, Ozzy Osbourne, Simple Minds, Simply Red, Nazareth, Scorpions, Depeche Mode, Dream Theater, Enrique Iglesias, Linkin Park, Lenny Kravitz, Dima Bilan, Avril Lavigne, Snoop Dogg, Backstreet Boys, R.E.M. and Helena Paparizou, David Guetta ft. Kelly Rowland, Kylie Minogue, Ed Sheeran.

Gallery

See also
Jeep Arena
List of indoor arenas in Lithuania

References

External links

Indoor arenas in Lithuania
Basketball venues in Lithuania
Basketball in Vilnius
Sports venues in Vilnius
Indoor ice hockey venues in Lithuania
Lithuania
Šeškinė
2021 FIFA Futsal World Cup venues